Mischief City is a short-lived Canadian animated children's show based on the book of the same name by Tim Wynne-Jones. It follows the adventures of eight-year-old Winchell Adams in the extraordinary world of Mischief City. While in this fantasy world, Winchell is accompanied by Maxine, another eight-year-old, and her two monsters Hey Hey and Mr. Cube. The group often faces odd and unusual problems (such as bathtub races and stopping a meteor of solid peas from hitting the planet) most of which are a direct result of Maxine's troublesome older brother Duane. The series first aired on January 4, 2005.

Storyline
Each episode follows a fairly consistent plot. The episodes begin in Winchell's house where Winchell is confronted with a real-world problem (such as his younger sister stealing his sea chimps or realizing how small he is) but before he can solve it, he is whisked away to the fantasy world of Mischief City. There he is immediately greeted by Maxine and her two monsters Hey Hey and Mr. Cube. Maxine usually informs Winchell of some trouble or event occurring in Mischief City which the group attends to, resulting in an adventure. Once the adventure in Mischief City has concluded, Winchell returns to the real world and is able to deal with the initial problem.

Characters

Winchell Adams
Voiced by Austin di Lulio

An eight-year-old child with red hair, freckles and a yellow striped shirt. As the main character, Winchell constantly switches between the real world and the fantasy world of Mischief City and must deal with problems in both worlds as a result. He often provides imaginative solutions to the Mischief City problems and has demonstrated a comprehensive understanding of how this fantasy world works. Often, Winchell even surpasses the knowledge that Mischief City's own inhabitants have of their world.

Maxine
Voiced by Annick Obonsawin

An eight-year-old inhabitant of Mischief City. She wears large purple glasses and an orange shirt with striped sleeves. Her hair is tied into pony tails which also function as helicopter blades allowing Maxine to fly. She is Winchell's primary friend in the series and often provides Winchell with the current events of Mischief City when he arrives. She is the owner and caretaker of the two monsters Hey Hey and Mr. Cube. She has a villainous older brother named Duane.

Hey Hey
Voiced by Adrian Truss

A green monster with a pear-shaped body, downward-facing horns and large nose. Dimwitted and inarticulate, Hey Hey provides hilarity through stupidity and often does so with his close companion Mr. Cube. Both have a pet/friend relationship with Maxine, as she is their owner but treats them as equals.

Mr. Cube
Voiced by John Stocker

A red monster with a cube-shaped body, upward-facing horns and no nose. As dimwitted as Hey Hey but with a more refined dialect, Mr. Cube also provides humour through stupidity and is a close companion of Hey Hey. The two are nearly always together and have a brother-like relationship though it is unclear if they are indeed related.

Duane
Voiced by Peter Oldring

The recurring antagonist of the series, Duane is the older brother of Maxine. Greedy, selfish and power-hungry Duan has been a constant cause of dismay in Mischief City. As a result, he hasn't many friends and has earned the dislike of both Maxine and her monsters as well as Winchell.

Minor characters
 Clio (voiced by Annick Obonsawin) – Winchell's baby sister
 Mrs. Adams (voiced by Linda Ballantyne) – Winchell's mother
 Mr. Adams (voiced by Peter Keleghan) – Winchell's father 
 Mr. Square (voiced by Frank Welker) – Duane's Monster Dog

Episodes

Season 1

Season 2

References

External links
 Mischief city at IMDb

2000s Canadian animated television series
2005 Canadian television series debuts
2005 Canadian television series endings
YTV (Canadian TV channel) original programming
Animated television series about children
Television series by 9 Story Media Group